Röbel-Müritz is an Amt in the Mecklenburgische Seenplatte district, in Mecklenburg-Vorpommern, Germany. The seat of the Amt is in the town of Röbel.

The Amt Röbel-Müritz consists of the following municipalities:

Ämter in Mecklenburg-Western Pomerania
Mecklenburgische Seenplatte (district)